Akira Watanabe may refer to:

, Japanese special effects art director
, Japanese motocross racer
, Japanese Scouting leader
, Japanese shogi player
 Akira Watanabe, director of the 1987 anime Zillion (anime)

See also
Watanabe